"Hold You" or "Hold Yuh" is a song by Jamaican singer and songwriter Gyptian from the album Hold You. It was released on July 24, 2010 in the United States and was released in the United Kingdom on November 7, 2010. The song peaked at number 77 on the Billboard Hot 100, number 16 on the UK Singles Chart and number 69 on the Canadian Hot 100.

In June 2013, the song was certified Gold in the United States by the RIAA after achieving sales of 500,000. In 2017, the song was included on Billboard's 12 Best Dancehall & Reggaeton Choruses of the 21st Century at number six. In October 2018, the song was certified Platinum in the United Kingdom by the BPI after achieving sales of 600,000.
Jamaican singer Heavy Noni sampled it for his 2019 song My Goody.

Remix

Nicki Minaj Remix
The official remix for the song features rapper Nicki Minaj. It spent 29 weeks on the Billboard Hot R&B/Hip-Hop Songs and 15 weeks on the Billboard Hot 100. Minaj has performed her verse on select dates of her debut concert tour, the Pink Friday Tour. She has also performed her verse on her Pink Friday: Reloaded Tour, on The Pinkprint Tour and on The Nicki Wrld Tour.

Other Remixes
There is also a remix with the artist Don Omar and artist Natti Natasha, released as a remix in Latin version, this was released on 10 December 2010. 

Foxy Brown (rapper) visited the UK version of the song.

Track listing

Chart performance

Weekly charts

Year-end charts

Certifications

Release history

References

2010 debut singles
Gyptian songs
Columbia Records singles
Nicki Minaj songs
2010 songs
2010 singles